Dilithium, Li2, is a strongly electrophilic, diatomic molecule comprising two lithium atoms covalently bonded together.  Li2 is known in the gas phase. 
It has a bond order of 1, an internuclear separation of 267.3 pm and a bond energy of 102 kJ/mol or 1.06 eV in each bond. 
The electron configuration of Li2 may be written as σ2.

It has been observed that 1% (by mass) of lithium in the vapor phase is in the form of dilithium.

Being the lightest stable neutral homonuclear diatomic molecule after H2, and the helium dimer, dilithium is an extremely important model system for studying fundamentals of physics, chemistry, and electronic structure theory. 
It is the most thoroughly characterized compound in terms of the accuracy and completeness of the empirical potential energy curves of its electronic states. Analytic empirical potential energy curves have been constructed for the X-state, a-state, A-state, c-state, B-state, 2d-state, l-state, E-state, and the F-state  . The most reliable of these potential energy curves are of the Morse/Long-range variety (see entries in the table below).

Li2 potentials are often used to extract atomic properties.
This lithium oscillator strength is related to the radiative lifetime of atomic lithium and is used as a benchmark for atomic clocks and measurements of fundamental constants.

See also 

 Morse/Long-range potential
 Dilithium molecular orbital diagram
 Dilithium (Star Trek)
 Lithium

References

Further reading 

 

Lithium
Homonuclear diatomic molecules
Allotropes

de:Dilithium
it:Litio#Dilitio